Quinn Kelsey (born 7 March 1978) is an American baritone, who is particularly noted for his performances in operas by Verdi.

Early life and training
Kelsey was born in Honolulu, Hawaii, and began performing opera in 1991 as a chorus member of the Hawaii Opera Theatre. He received his bachelor’s degree in music with a major in vocal performance from the University of Hawaii at Manoa under John W. Mount. He has studied in the following programs: Chautauqua Institute with Marlena Malas, San Francisco’s Merola Opera Program under Sherry Greenwald and Mark Morash, and three years at Chicago's Lyric Opera Center for American Artists (now known as the Ryan Opera Center), during which he sang Wagner in Gounod's Faust and Yamadori and the Registrar in Puccini's Madama Butterfly. He was also on the roster of the Marilyn Horne Foundation for two years, won a scholarship from the Solti Foundation of Chicago in 2003,  was a finalist of the Plácido Domingo Operalia Competition in 2004, and represented the United States in the BBC Cardiff Singer of the World Competition in 2005.

Operatic career
Kelsey made his debut at the Metropolitan Opera in New York City as Schaunard in Puccini's La bohème on 29 March 2008. Other roles at the Met have included Monterone in Verdi's Rigoletto (role debut on 13 January 2011), Marcello in Puccini's La bohème (23 September 2014), Germont in Verdi's La traviata (11 December 2014), Peter in Humperdinck's Hänsel und Gretel (18 December 2017), the Count di Luna in Verdi's Il trovatore (23 January 2018), Enrico in Donizetti's Lucia di Lammermoor (25 April 2018), and Amonasro in Verdi's Aida (26 September 2018).

He sang Zurga in Bizet's The Pearl Fishers at the London Coliseum with the English National Opera beginning on 1 June 2010, his first appearance with the company. His debut at the Royal Opera House was in 2016, as Germont in La traviata, and he also performed there the Count di Luna in Il trovatore.

He debuted with the Santa Fe Opera on 4 August 2015 in the title role of Verdi's Rigoletto, his singing described by Zachary Woolfe of The New York Times as "glamourous and persuasive, his roomy voice smoky, with bronzed tenorial resonances as its rises."

He has also appeared with the Canadian Opera Company, Zürich Opera, Hawaii Opera Theater, Norwegian National Opera, Semperoper Dresden, Rome Opera, Deutsche Oper Berlin, Frankfurt Opera, the Bregenz Festival and the Edinburgh Festival, and his roles have included the Forester in Janáček's The Cunning Little Vixen, Athanaël in Massenet's Thaïs, and Sancho Panza in Massenet's Don Quichotte.

He sang the title role in Verdi's Rigoletto at the Opéra Bastille in a production by the Opéra National de Paris on 2 May 2016, a performance in which he is said to have "electrified the capacity audience". He also sang the role at the San Francisco Opera and the Chicago Lyric Opera in 2017.

Kelsey sang the role of Germont in La traviata at the Metropolitan Opera on 4 December 2018, a new production and the first appearance of Yannick Nézet-Séguin as the Met’s new music director. Violetta was sung by Diana Damrau, and Alfredo, by Juan Diego Flórez. F. Paul Driscoll, in his review of the performance in Opera News, wrote: "All of the leading roles were sung with distinction, but Quinn Kelsey’s splendid Giorgio Germont was the most satisfactory of the three principal performances. Kelsey’s hefty, mahogany-colored baritone is ideal for Germont’s music, and his shrewd, dignified command of the drama made his Act II meeting with Violetta eminently affecting..." The fourth performance with this cast (15 December) was simulcast as part of the Metropolitan Opera Live in HD series.

He made his role debut as Scarpia in Puccini's Tosca on 5 May 2021 (during the COVID-19 pandemic) in a "heavily deconstructed concert performance" with Opera Philadelphia at the Mann Center for the Performing Arts, an amphitheatre in Philadelphia's Fairmount Park. Ana María Martínez sang Tosca, and Brian Jagde, Cavaradossi. Opera magazine declared that Kelsey "nearly stole the show with his oaken timbre, incisive phrasing and seductively evil approach." His stage debut in the role followed soon thereafter (23 July) with the Cincinnati Opera at the outdoor venue of Summit Park (built on the site of the former Blue Ash Airport). Martínez was again Tosca, while Russell Thomas sang Cavaradossi. Opera commented that "Kelsey brought to Scarpia a nuanced evil, with his stated preference for ‘violent conquests’ over romantic encounters rendered even more chilling by his oily charm."

Kelsey sang the title role of Rigoletto for the first time at the Metropolitan Opera on 31 December 2021, in a new production by Bartlett Sher with sets by Michael Yeargan and costumes by Catherine Zuber. The cast included Rosa Feola as Gilda and Piotr Beczała as the Duke, and the performance was conducted by Daniele Rustioni. Anthony Tommasini, music critic of The New York Times, wrote: "The baritone Quinn Kelsey, a Met stalwart for over a decade, had a breakthrough as the jester Rigoletto, part of the retinue of the lecherous Duke of Mantua. With his brawny, penetrating voice and imposing presence, Kelsey has always been an arresting artist. But this role shows off his full vocal and dramatic depth." F. Paul Driscoll of Opera News reported: "Center stage was the prodigious Quinn Kelsey, in his first local performance as Rigoletto, a role he has previously sung with ten major companies in the U.S. and Europe. Kelsey was superlative, fully realizing Rigoletto’s sharp wit, titanic anger and paternal tenderness—and singing with the handsome, burnished tone, incisive prosody and charismatic presence worthy of a true Verdian. The opening-night audience cheered him to the echo, and deservedly so." The performance of 29 January 2022, with the same cast and conductor, was simulcast as part of the Metropolitan Opera Live in HD series.

Personal life
Kelsey met his former wife, soprano Marjorie Owens, originally from Chesapeake, Virginia, when both were resident at the Ryan Opera Center in Chicago. Kelsey and Owens have occasionally sung together on tour, performing Il trovatore in Dresden and giving duo recitals, for instance, in Honolulu (25 January 2015); in Santa Fe (2 August 2015), where Kelsey was performing in Rigoletto; and in New York City (10 December 2017) at the Morgan Library's Gilder Lehrman Hall. Chicago remains as Kelsey’s main home base. He became engaged to Canadian mezzo-soprano Deanna Pauletto in 2018.

Awards
In 2015, Kelsey was the recipient of the Met's Beverly Sills Artist Award and in 2022, one of the 17th annual Opera News Awards (along with Denyce Graves and Elsa van den Heever), awarded by Opera News magazine.

Videos
Streaming videos are available at Met Opera on Demand of his performances in the following roles:
 Amonasro in Verdi's Aida (6 October 2018)
 Germont in Verdi's La traviata (15 December 2018)
 Rigoletto in Verdi's Rigoletto (29 January 2022)

References

External links
 

1978 births
American operatic baritones
University of Hawaiʻi at Mānoa alumni
Living people
People from Honolulu
21st-century American opera singers
21st-century American male singers
21st-century American singers